Crotylbarbital (Mepertan, Kalipnon, Barotal), also known as crotarbital, is a barbiturate derivative developed by Eli Lilly in the 1930s It has sedative and hypnotic effects, and was used for the treatment of insomnia until it was replaced by newer alternative drugs with less side effects and lower risk of overdose.

See also 
 Barbiturate

References 

Alkene derivatives
Barbiturates
Hypnotics
Sedatives
GABAA receptor positive allosteric modulators
Crotyl compounds